Adrián Kaprálik (born 10 June 2002) is a Slovak professional footballer who currently plays for Fortuna Liga club MŠK Žilina as a forward.

Club career

MŠK Žilina
Kaprálik made his Fortuna Liga debut for Žilina in a home fixture against Spartak Trnava on 14 June 2020. He came on as a second-half replacement for Patrik Iľko, when Žilina led by a single goal, following strikes by Dávid Ďuriš and Ján Bernát. The scoresheet remained unchanged and Žilina took the 2:1 victory. He scored his first league goal in a 4-2 win over AS Trenčín.

International career
Kaprálik was first recognised in a senior national team nomination by Štefan Tarkovič as an alternate in September 2022 ahead of three 2022 FIFA World Cup qualifiers against Slovenia, Croatia and Cyprus. Following a managerial change in the summer of 2022, when Tarkovič was replaced by Francesco Calzona, Kaprálik penetrated into the 27-man squad of Calzona's second nomination for two November friendlies against Montenegro and Chile, which marked Marek Hamšík's retirement game.

On 17 November 2022, during a fixture versus Montenegro at Podgorica City Stadium, Kaprálik was only listed as a substitute and remained benched for the entirety of the 2–2 draw. Three days later, on 20 November at Tehelné pole against Chile, Kaprálik made his senior international debut. He came on in the 89th minute of the match to replace Tomáš Suslov on the right-wing in the same batch of substitutions, which saw Marek Hamšík walk off internationally for the last time. During Kaprálik's tenure on the pitch the scored did not change, remaining at 0–0. Shortly after, in December 2022, Kaprlík was also shortlisted in a nomination for senior national team prospective players' training camp at NTC Senec, being only one of seven players in the 27-man strong squad with previous international appearances at senior level.

References

External links
 MŠK Žilina official club profile
 
 Futbalnet profile
 

2002 births
Living people
People from Trstená
Sportspeople from the Žilina Region
Slovak footballers
Slovakia youth international footballers
Slovakia under-21 international footballers
Slovakia international footballers
Association football forwards
MŠK Žilina players
2. Liga (Slovakia) players
Slovak Super Liga players